A tippet is a scarf-like garment.

Tippet or Tippit may also refer to:

 A piece of fly fishing tackle
 Clark Tippet, an American dancer
 Jack Tippit, an American cartoonist
 Michael Tippett, An English composer
 J. D. Tippit, an American policeman
 Wayne Tippit, an American actor
 Vice Admiral Sir Anthony Tippet KCB, a British Royal Navy Officer
 Tippit, a Welsh game
 A bird's neck plumage
 An animal's neck fur